Jeanne Marie Beaumont is an American poet, author of four poetry collections, most recently, "Letters from Limbo" (CavanKerry Press, 2016),Burning of the Three Fires (BOA Editions, Ltd. 2010), Curious Conduct (BOA Editions, Ltd., 2004), and "Placebo Effects" (Norton, 1997). Her work has appeared in Boston Review, Barrow Street, Colorado Review, Court Green, Harper’s, Harvard Review, Manhattan Review, The Nation, New American Writing, Ploughshares, Poetry Northwest, Witness, and World Literature Today, and she has had poems featured on The Writer's Almanac with Garrison Keillor. In 2006, San Francisco film-maker Jay Rosenblatt, made a film based on her poem "Afraid So" as narrated by Garrison Keillor. The film has been shown at several major international film festivals and included on a program of Rosenblatt's work screened at the Museum of Modern Art in October 2010.  Beaumont was the co-editor of American Letters & Commentary from 1992 to 2000. She was judge for the 2011 Cider Press Review Book Award. She grew up in the suburban Philadelphia area and moved to New York City in 1983. She earned her B.A. from Eastern College and an M.F.A. in Writing from Columbia University. She has taught at Rutgers University and regularly teaches at the 92nd Street Y. She served as the Director of The Frost Place Advanced Seminar from 2007–2010 and serves on the faculty for the Stonecoast MFA Program in Creative Writing.

Honors and awards
 1996 National Poetry Series, for Placebo Effects, William Matthews
 2003 The Greensboro Review literary award for poetry
 2009 Dana Award for poetry

Published works
"Letters from Limbo," CavanKerry Press, Ltd. 2016. 
 Burning of the Three Fires, BOA Editions, Ltd. 2010. 

Anthologies Edited
 
 

Anthology Publications
 Don't Leave Hungry:Fifty Years of Southern Poetry Review (University of Arkansas Press, 2009)
 When She Named Fire: An Anthology of Contemporary Poetry by American Women (Autumn House Press, 2009)
 Good Poems for Hard Times (Viking, 2005)
 Starting Today: 100 Poems for Obama's First 100 Days (University of Iowa Press, 2010)
 The Year's Best Fantasy and Horror 2007 (St. Martin's Griffin Press, 2007)
 Blues for Bill: A Tribute to William Matthews (University of Akron Pr., 2005)
 Poetry Daily: 366 Poems from the World's Most Popular Poetry Website (Sourcebooks, Inc, 2003)

References

External links
 Author's Website
 Profile: Columbia Magazine > The Project of Making: Poet Jeanne Marie Beaumont by Andrew Krivak
 Poem: Boston Review > Making History by Jeanne Marie Beaumont
 

Year of birth missing (living people)
Living people
Poets from Pennsylvania
Writers from New York (state)
Columbia University School of the Arts alumni
American women poets
Eastern University (United States) alumni
Rutgers University faculty
21st-century American poets
21st-century American women writers
American women academics